Mark Ferguson is an English former professional footballer who played as a forward for Tranmere Rovers.

References

1960 births
Living people
Footballers from Liverpool
Association football forwards
English footballers
Tranmere Rovers F.C. players
Scarborough F.C. players
Northwich Victoria F.C. players
English Football League players